John William Callahan (October 3, 1874 – February 15, 1954) was an American Major League Baseball pitcher. He played for the St. Louis Browns during the  season.

References

Major League Baseball pitchers
St. Louis Browns (NL) players
Baseball players from Missouri
1874 births
1954 deaths
19th-century baseball players
Bay City Sugar Citys players